Ironton Lodge Hall, also known as Star of the West Lodge, No. 133,A. F. & A. M. Building; and Iron Lodge No. 107. I.O.O.F., is a historic lodge hall located at Ironton, Iron County, Missouri. It was built in 1873, and is a three-story, rectangular brick building with Italianate and Greek Revival style design elements.  It measures 29 feet by 57 feet. It was built to serve primarily as a meeting place for fraternal lodges.

It has served as a Masonic lodge building and as an IOOF hall, and as of 2014 houses the Arcadian Academy of Music.

It was listed on the National Register of Historic Places in 2013.

References

Clubhouses on the National Register of Historic Places in Missouri
Masonic buildings in Missouri
Odd Fellows buildings in Missouri
Italianate architecture in Missouri
Greek Revival architecture in Missouri
Buildings and structures completed in 1873
Buildings and structures in Iron County, Missouri
National Register of Historic Places in Iron County, Missouri
1873 establishments in Missouri